Vishlaq-e Olya (also Romanized as Vīshlaq-e ‘Olyā and Vīshlaq ‘Olyā; also known as Vaslar Yukāri, Vishlagh Olya, Vīshlaq Bālā, Vīshlaq-e Bālā, and Yukhari-Veshlya) is a village in Valdian Rural District, Ivughli District, Khoy County, West Azerbaijan Province, Iran. At the 2006 census, its population was 784, in 225 families.

References 

Populated places in Khoy County